Vaala (Finnish; Svalas in Swedish) is a district in the Itäharju-Varissuo ward of the city of Turku, in Finland. It is located to the east of the city centre, and consists mainly of a strip of low-density residential area between the more densely built suburbs of Varissuo and Lauste.

The current population of Vaala is 972, and it is decreasing at an annual rate of 0.62%. 30.35% of the district's population are under 15 years old, while 4.22% are over 65. The district's linguistic makeup is 85.29% Finnish, 2.47% Swedish, and 12.24% other.

See also
 Districts of Turku
 Districts of Turku by population

Districts of Turku